Pomonkey Junior-Senior High School was an all-black high school located in Indian Head, Maryland. From 1966 to 1969, it began to be integrated with the all white schools, Henry E. Lackey High School and La Plata High School. The old Pomonkey High School building was then re-opened as a public middle school in 1970, it was rededicated in 1970 as Matthew Henson Middle School.

See also
Matthew Henson Middle School

Defunct schools in Maryland